A church treasury or church treasure is the collection of historical art treasures belonging to a church, usually a cathedral or monastery (monastery treasure). Such "treasure" is usually held and displayed in the church's treasury or in a diocesan museum. Historically the highlight of church treasures was often a collection of reliquaries.

As a result of gifts and the desire to acquire sacred artifacts, many churches over the centuries gathered valuable and historic collections of altar plates, illuminated manuscripts of liturgical or religious books, as well as vestments, and other works of art or items of historical interest. Despite iconoclasm, secularism, looting, fire, the enforced sale of treasure in times of financial difficulty, theft and other losses, much of this treasure has survived or has even been repurchased.  Many large churches have been displaying their riches to visitors in some form for centuries.

Examples and museums of important church and cathedral treasures 

Austria:
 Salzburg Cathedral Museum
 Imperial Treasury in der Hofburg Palace, Vienna 
 Cathedral museum in the cathedral church of St. Stephen of Vienna, also called St. Stephen's Cathedral.

Czech Republic:
 Treasury of St. Vitus Cathedral, Prague

England
Most cathedrals have treasuries, though these generally lack the medieval metalwork of continental treasuries, which did not survive the Reformation. The exceptions to this include:
Canterbury Cathedral
Lincoln Cathedral
Durham Cathedral

France :
 Cathedral Notre-Dame de Paris
 Cathedral-Basilica of Saint-Denis
 Cathedral of Reims, in Palace of Tau

Germany:

 Aachen Cathedral Treasure
 Diocesan Museum, Bamberg, formerly the cathedral treasure of Bamberg Cathedral
 Treasure of Brunswick Cathedral, very much later called the Welf Treasure, since 1928 largely sold
 Essen Cathedral Treasure
 Halberstadt Cathedral Treasure
 Hildesheim Cathedral Museum (Cathedral treasure and diocesan museum)
 Cathedral Treasury, Cologne
 Cathedral and Diocesan Museum, Mainz with treasury in St. Nicholas' Chapel
 Diocesan Museum, Osnabrück with the cathedral treasure
 Archepiscopal Diocesan Museum and Treasury, Paderborn
 Cathedral Treasury and Diocesan Museum, Passau
 Speyer Cathedral Treasure in the Historical Museum of the Palatinate 
 Quedlinburg Cathedral Treasure
 Bishopric Museums, Regensburg
 Trier Cathedral Treasury
 Würzburg Cathedral Treasure
 Stift Museum, Xanten, previously the Xanten Cathedral Treasury (Domschatzkammer Xanten)
- also the cathedrals of Bautzen, Eibingen, Merseburg, Minden, Naumburg etc

Italy:
 Bozen Cathedral Treasure
 Brixen Cathedral Treasure
 Monza Cathedral, with the  Iron Crown of Lombardy, the Late Antique ivory Poet and Muse diptych, of about 500, as well as several of the small metal 6th century Monza ampullae 
 Troia Cathedral Treasure (planned to be transferred to the diocesan museum)
  Monreale Cathedral, important church treasure
 Palermo Cathedral, treasure includes the crown of Empress Constance of Aragon
 Treasury of St Mark's Basilica, Venice, famous for its collection of Byzantine loot
 St Peter's, Rome, and many other Roman churches 

Netherlands:
 Church treasure of Saint Servatius Basilica, Maastricht

Portugal:
 Braga Cathedral Treasure

Spain
 El Escorial

Switzerland:
 Treasure of the Basel Minster

See also 
 Reliquary

Literature 

 Lucas Burkart: Das Blut der Märtyrer. Genese, Bedeutung und Funktion mittelalterlicher Schätze. Böhlau, Cologne, 2009, 

Museology
Art collections